The 1924–25 Duke Blue Devils men's basketball team represented Duke University during the 1924–25 men's college basketball season. The head coach was George Buchheit, coaching his first season with the Blue Devils. The team finished with an overall record of 4–9.

Schedule

|-

References

Duke Blue Devils men's basketball seasons
Duke
1924 in sports in North Carolina
1925 in sports in North Carolina